Oleksandr Slobodeniuk (30 March 1971 – 29 December 2018) was a Soviet rower. He competed in the men's double sculls event at the 1992 Summer Olympics.

References

1971 births
2018 deaths
Soviet male rowers
Olympic rowers of the Unified Team
Rowers at the 1992 Summer Olympics
Place of birth missing